The Savannah River Site (SRS) is a U.S. Department of Energy (DOE) reservation in the United States in the state of South Carolina, located on land in Aiken, Allendale, and Barnwell counties adjacent to the Savannah River,  southeast of Augusta, Georgia. The site was built during the 1950s to refine nuclear materials for deployment in nuclear weapons.

It is owned by the U.S. Department of Energy (DOE). The management and operating contract is held by Savannah River Nuclear Solutions LLC (SRNS), a partnership between Fluor Corporation, Newport News Nuclear, Inc. (a subsidiary of Huntington Ingalls Industries) and Honeywell International, and the Integrated Mission Completion contract (including the former scope of the Liquid Waste Operations contract) is held by Savannah River Mission Completion, which is a team of companies led by BWX Technologies, AECOM, and Fluor. A major focus is cleanup activities related to work done in the past for American nuclear buildup. Currently none of the reactors on-site are operating (see list of nuclear reactors), although two of the reactor buildings are being used to consolidate and store nuclear materials. SRS is also home to the Savannah River National Laboratory and the United States' only operating radiochemical separations facility. Its tritium facilities are also the United States' only source of tritium, an essential component in nuclear weapons. The United States' only mixed oxide fuel (MOX) manufacturing plant was being constructed at SRS, but construction was terminated in February 2019.  Construction was overseen by the National Nuclear Security Administration. The MOX facility was intended to convert legacy weapons-grade plutonium into fuel suitable for commercial power reactors.

Future plans for the site cover a wide range of options, including host to research reactors, a reactor park for power generation, and other possible uses. DOE and its corporate partners are watched by a combination of local, regional and national regulatory agencies and citizen groups.

History
In 1950, the federal government requested that DuPont build and operate a nuclear facility near the Savannah River in South Carolina. The company had expertise in nuclear operations, having designed and built the plutonium production complex at the Hanford site for the Manhattan Project during World War II. A large portion of farmland, the towns of Ellenton and Dunbarton, and several other communities including Meyers Mill, Leigh, Robbins, and Hawthorne were bought under eminent domain, and the site of  became the Savannah River Site, managed by the U.S. Atomic Energy Commission. Biologists from the University of Georgia, led by professor Eugene Odum, began ecological studies of local plants and animals in 1951 creating Savannah River Ecology Laboratory (SREL), and plant construction began.

Production of heavy water for site reactors started in the Heavy Water Rework Facility in 1952, and the first production reactor, R Reactor, went critical in 1953. P, L, and K Reactors followed in 1954, and the first irradiated fuel was discharged. F Canyon, the world's first operational full-scale PUREX separation plant, began radioactive operations on 4 November. PUREX (Plutonium and Uranium EXtraction) extracted plutonium and uranium products from materials irradiated in the reactors.

In 1955, C Reactor went critical. The first plutonium shipment left the site. H Canyon, a chemical separation facility, began radioactive operations. Permanent tritium facilities became operational and the first shipment of tritium to the Atomic Energy Commission (AEC) was made. In 1956, the construction of the basic plant was complete.

Nobel Prize
The neutrino was discovered by Fred Reines and Clyde Cowan using the flux from P Reactor, with confirmation published in the 20 July 1956 issue of Science. Reines was awarded the 1995 Physics Nobel Prize; Cowan had already died.

In 1961, the AEC established a permanent ecology laboratory on the site; two Army barracks were converted into laboratory space for the scientists. The next year, the University of Georgia hired a full-time staff with doctoral degrees to expand the research effort. Known initially as the Laboratory of Radiation Ecology, it was renamed in the mid-1960s the Savannah River Ecology Laboratory, reflecting the broad spectrum of ecological studies carried out on the site.

In 1962, the Heavy Water Components Test Reactor (HWCTR) went into operation, testing the heavy water system for use with civilian power reactors. In 1963, Receiving Basin for Off-Site Fuels (RBOF) received its first shipment of off-site spent nuclear fuel. That same year, curium-244 was produced as a heat source for space exploration. This was the first full scale conversion of an SRP reactor load to non-weapons materials.

R-Reactor and HWCTR were shut down in 1964. In 1965, californium-252, the heaviest isotope produced at SRP, was separated as a byproduct of the curium program. Beginning in 1969, californium-252 was made in a separate production program.

Palomares
Following the 1966 Palomares B-52 crash, the Savannah River Site received contaminated soil from the environmental clean up and remediation. Soil with radiation contamination levels above 1.2 MBq/m2 was placed in 250-litre (66 U.S. gallon) drums and shipped to the Savannah River Plant for burial. A total of 2.2 hectares (5.4 acres) was decontaminated by this technique, producing 6,000 barrels. 17 hectares (42 acres) of land with lower levels of contamination was mixed to a depth of 30 centimeters (12 in) by harrowing and plowing. On rocky slopes with contamination above 120 kBq/m2, the soil was removed with hand tools and shipped to the United States in barrels.

In 1968, L Reactor was shut down for upgrades, and, in 1971, K Reactor became the first reactor to be controlled by computer.

The site was designated as a National Environmental Research Park in 1972.

1977 saw the startup of the Plutonium Fuel Fabrication (PUFF) Facility.

The Savannah River Archaeological Program (SRARP) was established onsite in 1978 to perform data analysis of prehistoric and historic sites on SRP land.

Remediation
In 1981, an environmental cleanup program began. M Area Settling Basin cleanup began under the Resource Conservation and Recovery Act (RCRA). The heavy water rework facility was closed in 1982. Construction of the Defense Waste Processing Facility (DWPF) began in 1983. Wackenhut Services Incorporated (WSI) began providing security support services at SRP.

In 1985, HB-Line began producing plutonium-238 for NASA's deep-space exploration program. The L-Reactor was restarted and C-Reactor shut down. A full-scale groundwater remediation system constructed in M-Area.

Construction of Saltstone and of the Replacement Tritium Facility began in 1986. In 1987, DuPont notified DOE that it would not continue to operate and manage the site. The Effluent Treatment Project (ETP) construction began.

In 1988, K, L and P Reactors were shut down. An Effluent Treatment Facility began operations to treat low-level radioactive wastewater from the F and H Area Separations facilities. In 1989, the site was included on the National Priority List and became regulated by the EPA. Westinghouse Savannah River Company (WSRC) assumed management and operation of site facilities. The name of the facility changed from Savannah River Plant (SRP) to Savannah River Site (SRS).

In 1990, construction of a cooling tower for K Reactor began. Saltstone started operation. In 1991, the mixed waste management facility became the first site facility to be closed and certified under the provisions of RCRA. L Reactor and M Area settling basin were shut down. With the end of the Cold War, production of nuclear materials for weapons use ceased.

Post-Cold War
Roger D. Wensil, a pipe-fitter, worked for the B.F. Shaw Co., a subcontractor at Savannah River. In 1985, Wensil was dismissed as a whistleblower, after he complained of safety violations and illegal drug use among construction workers building a sensitive nuclear waste-handling facility at the plant. In 1992, the U.S. Congress enacted "nuclear weapons whistleblower protection".

In 1992, the cooling tower was connected to the K Reactor, and the reactor operated briefly for the last time. The Secretary of Energy announced the phase-out of all uranium processing. Non-radioactive operations began at the Replacement Tritium Facility and the Defense Waste Processing Facility (DWPF). K Reactor was placed in cold standby condition in 1993. Non-radioactive test runs of the Defense Waste Processing Facility began. Construction began on the Consolidated Incineration Facility. Tritium introduced into the Replacement Tritium Facility and radioactive operations began. The Workforce Transition and Community Assistance was started.

In 1994, the Savannah River Site Citizens Advisory Board was established. The Replacement Tritium Facility saw its startup. In 1996, DWPF introduced radioactive material into the vitrification process. K Reactor was shut down. F Canyon was restarted and began stabilizing nuclear materials. In 1997, the first high-level radioactive waste tanks were closed, numbers 17 and 20. The Cold War Historic Preservation Program was begun.

In 2000, the K-Reactor building was converted to the K Area Materials Storage Facility. The Savannah River Site was selected as the location of three new plutonium facilities for: a MOX fuel fabrication; pit disassembly and conversion; and plutonium immobilization. WSRC earned the DOE's top safety performance honor of Star Status.

Thousands of shipments of transuranic waste were contained and sent by truck and by rail to the DOE's Waste Isolation Pilot Plant (WIPP) Project in New Mexico, with the first shipments beginning in 2001. DWPF completed production of four million pounds of environmentally acceptable classified waste.

In 2002, the F Canyon and FB Line facilities completed their last production run. The Savannah River Technology Center participated in a study of using a nuclear power reactor to produce hydrogen from water. Scientists reported finding a new species of radiation-resistant extremophiles inside one of the tanks. It was named Kineococcus radiotolerans.

In January 2003, Westinghouse Savannah River Co. completed transferring the last of F Canyon's radioactive material to H Tank Farm. DWPF began radioactive operations with its second melter, installed during a shutdown. The last depleted uranium metal was shipped from M Area for disposition at Envirocare of Utah. The last unit of spent nuclear fuel from RBOF was shipped across the site to L Reactor in preparation for RBOF's deactivation. Salt Waste Processing Facility (SWPF) construction began.

In 2004, the site shipped its 10,000th drum of transuranic waste to the Waste Isolation Pilot Plant (WIPP), a DOE facility in New Mexico, 12 years ahead of schedule. In a visit, Secretary of Energy Spencer Abraham designated the Savannah River National Laboratory (SRNL), one of 12 DOE national laboratories. Two prototype bomb disposal robots developed by SRNL were deployed for military use in Iraq.

2005 saw the Tritium Extraction Facility (TEF) completed for the purpose of extracting tritium from materials irradiated in the Tennessee Valley Authority's commercial nuclear reactors. Savannah River Site's first shipment of neptunium oxide arrived at the Argonne West Laboratory in Idaho. This was the last of the USA's neptunium inventory, and the last of the materials to be stabilized to satisfy commitments for stabilizing nuclear materials. F Canyon was the first major nuclear facility at the site to be suspended and deactivated. Low-enriched uranium (LEU) from the site was used by a Tennessee Valley Authority nuclear power reactor to generate electricity. The tritium facilities modernization and consolidation project completed start-up and replaced the gas purification and processing that took place in 232-H. WSRC began multi-stage layoffs of permanent employees.

In 2006, design work took place for the Salt Waste Processing Facility (SWPF), a facility designed to process radioactive liquid waste stored in underground storage tanks at the site. The SWPF project work is performed by a group anchored by Parsons Corp. Work continued on design of the MOX fuel fabrication facility by a company now known as Shaw AREVA MOX Services. The SRNL was designated as the Department of Energy Office of Environmental Management's "Corporate Laboratory." Aiken County's new Center for Hydrogen Research opened its doors. F-Area deactivation work was completed as was T-Area closure.

In 2007, the Tritium Extraction Facility (TEF) opened. On 1 August, construction officially began on the $4.86 billion MOX facility. Following startup testing, the facility expects a disposition rate of up to 3.5 tons of plutonium oxide each year.

In 2008, Savannah River Nuclear Solutions, LLC (SRNS) was awarded the contract for Maintenance and Operation of SRS. SRNS is a partnership between Fluor Corporation, Newport News Nuclear, Inc. (a subsidiary of Huntington Ingalls Industries) and Honeywell International. Savannah River Remediation (SRR) was awarded the contract for the Liquid Waste Operations of SRS. Historical markers were placed in P and R Areas commemorating the role both reactors played towards winning the Cold War. Construction on the Waste Solidification Building (WSB) began.

In 2009, SRS began The American Reinvestment and Recovery Act (ARRA) project representing a $1.6 billion investment in SRS. This project, expected to run through fiscal year 2011, will result in the accelerated cleanup of nuclear waste at SRS and a significant reduction in the site footprint. In 2009 alone, more than 1,500 new workers were hired and over 800 jobs retained, due to ARRA funding. SRS construction employees reached 23 million hours (11 consecutive years) without a lost time injury case.

M Area closure was completed in 2010, with the P and R Areas following in 2011.

In 2021, DOE awarded the new Integrated Mission Completion Contract to Savannah River Mission Completion, an LLC comprising BWX Technologies, Amentum's AECOM, and Fluor. Transition from the Liquid Waste Operations contract to the Integrated Mission Completion Contract was completed in early 2022.

MOX Fuel Fabrication Facility

The MOX Fuel Fabrication Facility was created to satisfy the nuclear non-proliferation agreement between the Russian Federation and the United States. The Russian Federation has met its obligations of the 2000 treaty, completed its processing facility and commenced processing of plutonium into MOX fuel with experimental quantities produced in 2014 for a cost of about $200 million, reaching industrial capacity in 2015. A report by the National Nuclear Security Administration estimated the total cost over a 20-year life cycle for the Savannah river site MOX plant to be $47 billion if the annual funding cap was increased to $500 million or $110 billion if it were increased to $375 million. Other studies have disputed this cost assessment as excessive. The estimated time-to-completion of the facility was also contingent upon annual appropriations, with an estimated construction completion date of FY2043 for the $500 million annual cap and FY2099 for the $375 million annual cap (where completion was indicated to not be possible for annual appropriations below this level).

The Obama and Trump administrations have proposed cancelling the project, but Congress continues to fund construction. The Aiken Chamber of Commerce of the state of South Carolina filed a lawsuit against the federal government claiming they have simply become a dumping ground for unprocessed weapons grade plutonium for the indefinite future and demanding previously agreed upon payment of contractual non-delivery fines. The federal government filed for dismissal and it was granted in February 2017.

The State of South Carolina similarly sued the federal government over the termination of the project, arguing that the Department of Energy had not prepared an environmental impact statement concerning the long-term storage of plutonium in the state and additionally that the government had failed to follow the statutory provisions concerning obtaining a waiver to cease construction on the facility. In January 2019, the Fourth Circuit Court of Appeals rejected South Carolina's suit for lack of standing; in October 2019 the U.S. Supreme Court rejected the state of South Carolina's petition of certiorari, thereby allowing the lower court's ruling to stand and the federal government to terminate construction.

In May 2018, Energy Secretary Rick Perry informed Congress he had effectively ended the about 70% complete project. Perry stated that the cost of a dilute and dispose approach to the plutonium will cost less than half of the remaining lifecycle cost of the MOX plant program. In February 2019, the Nuclear Regulatory Commission (NRC) granted a request to terminate the plant's construction authorization.

Litigation
After six years of litigation over plutonium moved to the site, South Carolina Attorney General Alan Wilson announced August 31, 2020 that the federal government agreed to pay the state $600 million. Wilson described this as "the single largest settlement in South Carolina's history".  The federal government also agreed to remove the remaining 9.5 metric tons of plutonium stored at the site by 2037. At a town hall meeting at USC-Aiken on August 20, 2021, S.C. Governor Henry McMaster led a discussion on how to spend $525 million of that amount.

Reactors

Savannah River is home to the following nuclear reactors:

(see list of nuclear reactors)

Contract changes
Management of the Savannah River Site was to be bid in 2006, but the Department of Energy extended the contract with the existing partners for 18 months to June 2008.

In 2006 DOE decided to split the WSRC contract into two new separate contracts, i.e. the M&O Contract and the Liquid Waste Contract to be awarded before June 2008. Responding to the DOE RFP, the Savannah River Nuclear Solutions (SRNS), LLC - now a Fluor partnership with Honeywell, and Huntington Ingalls Industries (formerly part of Northrop Grumman) - submitted a proposal in June 2007 for the new M&O Contract. A team led by URS and including many of the WSRC partners also submitted a proposal. On January 9, 2008 it was announced that SRNS LLC had won the new contract, with a 90-day transition period to start 24 January 2008. However, the transition was delayed by a protest filed with GAO by the URS team on 22 January 2008. The GAO denied the protest on 25 April. DOE-SR then directed SRNS to start transition on 2 May and take over operation on 1 August 2008.

See also
Savannah River National Laboratory
RELAP5-3D (Reactor Excursion and Leak Analysis Program), developed at Idaho National Laboratory for reactor safety analysis and reactor design at the Savannah River Site
PUFF-PLUME, an atmospheric dispersion model developed for emergency response use at the Savannah River Site
Building Bombs, a 1991 documentary film by Atlanta filmmakers Mark Mori and Susan J. Robinson

References

Further reading
Frederickson, Kari. Cold War Dixie: Militarization and Modernization in the American South (University of Georgia Press; 2013) 256 pages; the economic, social, environmental, and political impact of the Plant

External links

Official website of the Savannah River Site
Official website of the MOX (Mixed Oxide) Project
Official website of the Savannah River National Laboratory (SRNL)
Official website of the Savannah River Site Heritage Foundation
Official website of the Department of Energy
Official website of Savannah River Nuclear Solutions, LLC (SRNS)
Official website of Washington Division of URS Corp.
Official website of Parsons Corp.
Official website of Bechtel
Annotated bibliography for Savannah River from the Alsos Digital Library for Nuclear Issues
Official EPA Tritium Fact Sheet
Savannah River Site Mortality Study from the National Institute for Occupational Safety and Health

National Nuclear Security Agency (NNSA): Mixed Oxide (MOX) Fuel Fabrication Facility reports and studies
Official website of Savannah River Ecology Laboratory (SREL)
Official website of Savannah River Mission Completion, LLC

 
Atomic tourism
Bechtel
Buildings and structures in Aiken County, South Carolina
Buildings and structures in Allendale County, South Carolina
Buildings and structures in Barnwell County, South Carolina
Economy of Augusta, Georgia
Historic American Engineering Record in South Carolina
Military nuclear reactors
Nuclear reprocessing sites
Nuclear weapons infrastructure of the United States
Superfund sites in South Carolina
United States Department of Energy facilities
1950s establishments in South Carolina
Savannah River
Economy of South Carolina
Continuity of government in the United States